Nadan Mahal Road is a road located in Lucknow, Uttar Pradesh in India, that travels through Yahiyaganj.The road is  in length, it starts at Rakabganj Chauraha and ends at Nakhas Chauraha on Tulsidas Marg.

Places of interest

Nadan Mahal (mausoleum of Shaikh Ibrahim Chishti)
Yahiyaganj (shopping district)

References

Roads in Lucknow